Kazuki Kurokawa (黒川和樹, born 17 June 2001) is a Japanese athlete. He competed in the men's 400 metres hurdles event at the 2020 Summer Olympics.

References

External links
 

2001 births
Living people
Japanese male hurdlers
Athletes (track and field) at the 2020 Summer Olympics
Olympic athletes of Japan
Place of birth missing (living people)
People from Shimonoseki
Sportspeople from Yamaguchi Prefecture